Ellen Irene Diggs (1906–1998) was an American anthropologist. She was the writer of a major contribution to African American history, Black Chronology: From 4,000 B.C. to the Abolition of the Slave Trade.

Biography 
Diggs was born on April 13, 1906, in Monmouth, to parents Charles Henry and Alice Diggs and raised in a "supportive environment" that fostered her academic pursuits and other ambitions

Diggs pursued her undergraduate work at Monmouth College and the University of Minnesota. She received her master's degree from Atlanta University where she was a research assistant to W. E. Burghardt Du Bois. As Du Bois' research assistant, she aided in the research of five of his books.

Works
Black chronology from 4000 B.C. to the abolition of the slave trade, G.K. Hall, 1983,

References

Bibliography

1906 births
1998 deaths
People from Monmouth, Illinois
Monmouth College alumni
University of Minnesota alumni
20th-century American anthropologists